Patriotism is the feeling of love, devotion, and sense of attachment to one's country. This attachment can be a combination of many different feelings, language relating to one's own homeland, including ethnic, cultural, political or historical aspects. It encompasses a set of concepts closely related to nationalism, mostly civic nationalism and sometimes cultural nationalism.

Some manifestations of patriotism emphasize the "land" element in love for one's native land and use the symbolism of agriculture and the soil – compare Blut und Boden.

Terminology and usage 
An excess of patriotism in the defense of a nation is called chauvinism; another related term is jingoism.

The English word 'Patriot' derived from "Compatriot," in the 1590s, from Middle French "Patriote" in the 15th century. The French word's "Compatriote" and "Patriote" originated directly from Late Latin Patriota "fellow-countryman" in the 6th century. From Greek Patriotes "fellow countryman," from Patrios "of one's fathers," Patris "fatherland." The term Patriot was "applied to barbarians who were perceived to be either uncivilized or primitive who had only a common Patris or fatherland." The original European meaning of Patriots applied to anyone who was a fellow countryman originated from that country regardless of the social-economic status.

History

The general notion of civic virtue and group dedication has been attested in culture globally throughout the historical period. For the Enlightenment thinkers of 18th-century Europe, loyalty to the state was chiefly considered in contrast to loyalty to the Church. It was argued that clerics should not be allowed to teach in public schools since their patrie was heaven, so that they could not inspire love of the homeland in their students. One of the most influential proponents of this classical notion of patriotism was Jean-Jacques Rousseau.

Enlightenment thinkers also criticized what they saw as the excess of patriotism. In 1774, Samuel Johnson published The Patriot, a critique of what he viewed as false patriotism. On the evening of 7 April 1775, he made the famous statement, "Patriotism is the last refuge of the scoundrel." James Boswell, who reported this comment in his Life of Johnson, does not provide context for the quote, and it has therefore been argued that Johnson was in fact attacking the false use of the term "patriotism" by contemporaries such as John Stuart, 3rd Earl of Bute (the patriot-minister) and his supporters; Johnson spoke elsewhere in favor of what he considered "true" patriotism. However, there is no direct evidence to contradict the widely held belief that Johnson's famous remark was a criticism of patriotism itself.

Cultural aspects

Culture is often an integral aspect of patriotism. Many patriotic people take pride in sharing a distinct, common culture, believing it to be central to their national identity and unity. Many are devoted to the preservation of their traditional culture and encourage cultural assimilation. However, some of the more civic forms of patriotism tend to de-emphasize ethnic culture in favor of a shared political culture.

Philosophical issues
Patriotism may be strengthened by adherence to a national religion (a civil religion or even a theocracy). This is the opposite of the separation of church and state demanded by the Enlightenment thinkers who saw patriotism and faith as similar and opposed forces. Michael Billig and Jean Bethke Elshtain have both argued that the difference between patriotism and faith is difficult to discern and relies largely on the attitude of the one doing the labelling.

Christopher Heath Wellman, professor of philosophy at Washington University in St. Louis, describes that a popular view of the "patriotist" position is robust obligations to compatriots and only minimal samaritan responsibilities to foreigners. Wellman calls this position "patriotist" rather than "nationalist" to single out the members of territorial, political units rather than cultural groups.

George Orwell, in his influential essay Notes on Nationalism distinguished patriotism from the related concept of nationalism:

By 'patriotism' I mean devotion to a particular place and a particular way of life, which one believes to be the best in the world but has no wish to force upon other people. Patriotism is of its nature defensive, both militarily and culturally. Nationalism, on the other hand, is inseparable from the desire for power. The abiding purpose of every nationalist is to secure more power and more prestige, not for himself but for the nation or other unit in which he has chosen to sink his own individuality.

Opposition 

Voltaire stated that "It is lamentable, that to be a good patriot one must become the enemy of the rest of mankind." Arthur Schopenhauer wrote in his The World as Will and Representation that “The cheapest sort of pride is national pride; for if a man is proud of his own nation, it argues that he has no qualities of his own of which a person can be proud”

Kōtoku Shūsui, a famous Japanese anarchist of the late 19th/early 20th century, devoted a large section of his widely read Imperialism, Monster of the Twentieth Century to a condemnation of patriotism.  One of the many arguments is based on the Confucian value of empathy: "I am as convinced as Mencius that any man would rush without hesitation to rescue a child who was about to fall into a well... A human being moved by such selfless love and charity does not pause to think whether the child is a family member or a close relative.  When he rescues the child from danger, he does not even ask himself whether the child is his own or belongs to another."  Patriotism is used to dehumanize others who we would naturally have empathy for.  He argues, "[P]atriotism is a discriminating and arbitrary sentiment confined to those who belong to a single nation state or live together within common national borders", a sentiment cultivated and used by militarists in their drive for war. 

Marxists have taken various stances regarding patriotism. On one hand, Karl Marx famously stated that "The working men have no country" and that "the supremacy of the proletariat will cause them [national differences] to vanish still faster." The same view is promoted by present-day Trotskyists such as Alan Woods, who is "in favour of tearing down all frontiers and creating a socialist world commonwealth." On the other hand, Marxist-Leninists and Maoists are usually in favour of socialist patriotism based on the theory of socialism in one country.

Anarchists are known for their tendency to oppose patriotism, as exemplified by Emma Goldman, who stated: Indeed, conceit, arrogance, and egotism are the essentials of patriotism. Let me illustrate. Patriotism assumes that our globe is divided into little spots, each one surrounded by an iron gate. Those who have had the fortune of being born on some particular spot, consider themselves better, nobler, grander, more intelligent than the living beings inhabiting any other spot. It is, therefore, the duty of everyone living on that chosen spot to fight, kill, and die in the attempt to impose his superiority upon all the others.

Region-specific issues
In the European Union, thinkers such as Jürgen Habermas have advocated a "Euro-patriotism", but patriotism in Europe is usually directed at the nation-state and more often than not coincides with "Euroscepticism".

Surveys
Several surveys have tried to measure patriotism for various reasons, such as the Correlates of War project which found some correlation between war propensity and patriotism. The results from different studies are time dependent. For example, patriotism in Germany before World War I ranked at or near the top, whereas today it ranks at or near the bottom of patriotism surveys.

Since 1981, the World Values Survey explores people's national values and beliefs and refer to the average answer "for high income residents" of a country to the question "Are you proud to be [insert nationality]?". It ranges from 1 (not proud) to 4 (very proud).

See also

References

Further reading

 Charles Blatberg, From Pluralist to Patriotic Politics: Putting Practice First, Oxford University Press, 2000. .
 Craig Calhoun, Is it Time to Be Postnational?, in Ethnicity, Nationalism, and Minority Rights, (eds.) Stephen May, Tariq Modood and Judith Squires. Cambridge: Cambridge UP, 2004. pp. 231–56.
 Paul Gomberg, “Patriotism is Like Racism,” in Igor Primorac, ed., Patriotism, Humanity Books, 2002, pp. 105–12. .
 Jürgen Habermas, “Appendix II: Citizenship and National Identity,” in Between Facts and Norms: Contributions to a Discourse Theory of Law and Democracy, trans. William Rehg, MIT Press, 1996.
 Johan Huizinga, “Patriotism and Nationalism in European History”. In Men and Ideas. History, the Middle Ages, the Renaissance. Transl. by James S. Holmes and Hans van Marle. New York: Meridian Books, 1959.
 Alasdair MacIntyre, 'Is Patriotism a Virtue?', in: R. Beiner (ed.), Theorizing Citizenship, 1995, State University of New York Press, pp. 209–28.
 Joshua Cohen and Martha C. Nussbaum, For Love of Country: Debating the Limits of Patriotism, Beacon Press, 1996. .
 George Orwell, "Notes on Nationalism" in England Your England and Other Essays, Secker and Warburg, 1953.
 Igor Primoratz, ed., Patriotism, Humanity Books, 2002. .
 Daniel Bar-Tal and Ervin Staub, Patriotism, Wadsworth Publishing, 1999. .
 Maurizio Viroli, For Love of Country: An Essay on Patriotism and Nationalism, Oxford University Press, 1997. .
 Gilbert K. Chesterton 1922 that America is "the only nation in the world that is founded on a creed. That creed is set forth with dogmatic and even theological lucidity in the Declaration of Independence."
 John Witherspoon The Dominion of Providence Over The Passions of Man, Princeton May 17, 1776.

 
Political terminology